Rodopa may refer to:

 Rhodope Mountains
 PFC Rodopa Smolyan, Bulgarian football club